Stuart Frank Parsell (August 6, 1928 – November 19, 2015) was an American football coach and college athletics administrator. He served as the head football coach at Olivet College in Olivet, Michigan from 1959 to 1970, compiling a record of 47–57. Parsell was also the athletic director at Olivet from 1960 to 1971.

Head coaching record

College

References

External links
 Olivet Athletic Hall of Fame profile
 Obituary
 Olivet News Release
 

1928 births
2015 deaths
Olivet Comets athletic directors
Olivet Comets football coaches
High school football coaches in Michigan
Michigan State University alumni